in Japanese, is human feeling that complements and opposes the value of giri, or social obligation, within the Japanese worldview.  Broadly speaking, ninjō is said to be the human feeling that inescapably springs up  with social obligation.  As ninjō is a culture-specific term, the validity or importance of this concept is subject to a wide range of viewpoints, inextricably tied into one's perspective on nihonjinron, which compares Japan with other cultures to establish what is unique about the country.

Concept 
Ninjō is roughly translated as "human feeling" or "emotion" and could also be interpreted as a specific aspect of these terms such as generosity or sympathy towards the weak. The classic example of ninjō is that of a samurai who falls in love with an unacceptable partner (perhaps somebody of low social class or somebody of an enemy clan).  As a loyal member of his clan, he then becomes torn between the obligation to his feudal lord and his personal feelings, with the only possible resolution being shinjū or double love-suicide. This demonstrates how giri is superior to ninjō in the Japanese worldview since the latter could weaken an individual's devotion to his duty.

The correspondence to William Shakespeare's play Romeo and Juliet or the Aeneid would be made by Japanese and non-Japanese alike.  The question of whether modern Japanese still feel a greater sense of giri than their Western counterparts, and thus remain in some ineffable way psychologically closer to this sort of giri–ninjo conflict is precisely where nihonjinron divides into the Japan-centric and Japan-skeptic camps.

See also 
 Yose

References

Japanese values